Oliver Jones is a British special effects supervisor. Known for his works at LAIKA as a visual effects supervisor in acclaimed films such as  Coraline (2009), ParaNorman (2012), and Kubo and the Two Strings for which he received Academy Award for Best Visual Effects nomination at 89th Academy Awards, that he shared with Steve Emerson, Brian McLean, and Brad Schiff.

Filmography

References

External links
 Oliver Jones at Laika
 

Special effects people

Living people
Year of birth missing (living people)